"The Dummy" is episode 98 of the American television anthology series The Twilight Zone starring Cliff Robertson as a ventriloquist. It is not to be confused with a similar episode "Caesar and Me", in which Jackie Cooper plays a ventriloquist.

Opening narration

Plot
Ventriloquist Jerry Etherson is performing an act with his dummy Willy in a small club in New York City. At the end of the act, Willy seems to bite Jerry's hand, and after he goes back to his dressing room he finds teeth marks on his finger. He begins to drink from a liquor bottle he had hidden in a drawer. His agent, Frank, comes in and is upset that Jerry has resumed drinking. Jerry tells Frank, as he has numerous times before, that Willy is alive. Frank does not believe Jerry and has already pushed him into getting psychiatric help. Jerry is convinced that further psychiatric sessions would be redundant and that the only solution is to get rid of Willy and perform with a different dummy, "Goofy Goggles", from now on. He quickly comes up with new material for Goofy Goggles and locks Willy in a trunk.

After the second act, Jerry refuses to comply with the owner's wish that he and his dummy mingle with the audience. His agent considers this the last straw and quits, saying that Jerry's behavior, in particular what he sees as his delusional belief that Willy is alive, are keeping him from being a star. Jerry tells Frank he is leaving for Kansas City to get away from Willy. After leaving the theater, Jerry hears Willy's voice following him wherever he goes and sees his shadow on a wall. No one else can hear Willy, apparently confirming Frank's belief that Jerry is suffering from delusional fear.

Jerry runs back into the theater. He goes into the dark dressing room, opens the trunk, throws the dummy on the floor, and smashes it. But when he turns on the light, he realizes that he destroyed the Goofy Goggles dummy instead of Willy. He cannot understand how he could have been mistaken. He then sees Willy sitting on the couch, talking to him and laughing at him. Willy tells him that it was he, Jerry, who made him alive. Realizing the truth, Jerry lowers his head as Willy cackles crazily.

The scene cuts to a man in Kansas City announcing the next act, "Jerry and Willy". The ventriloquist is actually Willy, and he is holding Jerry, who has been turned into a dummy.

Closing narration

Production notes
Abner Biberman also directed "Number Twelve Looks Just Like You".

The dummy used in this episode to portray "Willy" was originally created in the 1940s by puppetmaker Revello Petee. The same dummy was used later, in the 1964 Twilight Zone episode, "Caesar and Me".  The actual original dummy which was used in both episodes had been housed in a private collection in Connecticut since the late 1970s, but now resides in David Copperfield's International Museum and Library of the Conjuring Arts in Las Vegas, along with the Cliff Robertson dummy effigy  which appears at the end of this episode.  Both puppets were subject to a careful, preservative renovation by American artist and puppet restoration expert Alan Semok.

References
DeVoe, Bill. (2008). Trivia from The Twilight Zone. Albany, GA: Bear Manor Media. 
Grams, Martin. (2008). The Twilight Zone: Unlocking the Door to a Television Classic. Churchville, MD: OTR Publishing.

External links

1962 American television episodes
The Twilight Zone (1959 TV series season 3) episodes
Ventriloquism
Television episodes written by Rod Serling
Television episodes directed by Abner Biberman